Højriis Castle is a manor house located at Sallingsund, 7 km south of Nykøbing, on the island of Mors in the north-west of Denmark.

History

Højriis traces its history back to the beginning of the 15th century. The first known owner is Johan Skarpenberg, a knight in the service of Queen Margrethe I, who owned several other estates in the area, including Spøttrup Castle in Salling on the other side of the water. He is buried at Viborg Cathedral.

The current castle dates from the second half of the 19th century. 

In the 20th century Højriis was hit hard by the adverse times for Danish manors. The building fell into a state of despair and was left uninhabited from 1865. This situation lasted until 1994 when the property was acquired by the current private owners.

Architecture
The castle is a three-winged complex built in the Historicist style which dominated Danish architecture at the time of its construction. The north-west wing and the tower were designed by Hans Jørgen Holm and built in 1859. The north-east and south-west wings were designed by August Klein and built in 1876. The complex is surrounded by moats.

Højriis Castle today
Højriis is still under restoration. The estate comprises 434 ha of land.

Owners

References

External links
 Official website

Manor houses in Denmark
Historicist architecture in Denmark
Buildings and structures in Morsø Municipality
Buildings and structures associated with the Banner family